KQMM-CD, virtual and UHF digital channel 29, is a low-powered, Class A Sonlife-affiliated television station licensed to Santa Maria, California, United States. The station is owned by Caballero Television.

History

On November 6, 1990, KQMM signed on as K14IG, and was later granted class A status in 2003.

On September 25, 2006, KQMM switched to the new MTV Tr3s network (now simply known as Tr3́s since July 2010), which was created as a result of Viacom's acquisition of Mas Musica.

On July 31, 2007, KQMM-CA was granted a construction permit to operate a digital companion channel on UHF channel 29. The digital station, KQMM-LD, went on the air on May 5, 2008.

On September 28, 2011, the station transferred their class A license to the digital channel, changing the call sign to KQMM-CD. On October 4, 2011, the station's analog license was cancelled and the KQMM-CA call sign was deleted by the Federal Communications Commission (FCC).

On August 3, 2015, KQMM-CD dropped the MTV Tres affiliation and started broadcasting Spanish religious programming from 3ABN Latino.

Digital channels
The station's digital signal is multiplexed:

References

External links 

QMM-CD
Television channels and stations established in 1990
Low-power television stations in the United States